The 2006 Missouri Tigers football team represented the University of Missouri during the 2006 NCAA Division I FBS football season.  The Tigers went 8-5, including a 4-4 record in Big 12 North play.  The season ended with a 39-38 loss in the Sun Bowl to Oregon State at El Paso. They played their home games at Faurot Field in Columbia, Missouri, and was coached by head coach Gary Pinkel.

Recruits

Schedule

Rankings

References

Missouri
Missouri Tigers football seasons
Missouri Tigers football